Mycobacterium moriokaense
Etymology: moriokaense, from Morioka, Japan where the organism was first isolated.

Description
Gram-positive, nonmotile and acid-fast rods (2-6 µm x 0.5 µm).

Colony characteristics
Dry, rough and nonpigmented (nonphotochromogenic) colonies.

Physiology
Rapid growth on Löwenstein-Jensen media at 28 °C, 37 °C and 42 °C, but not at 45 °C within 3 days.

Pathogenesis
Biosafety level 1

Type strain
First isolated from sputum of a patient with tuberculosis and from soil in Morioka, Japan.
Strain NCH E11715 = ATCC 43059 = CCUG 37671 = CIP 105393 = DSM 44221 = JCM 6375 = VKM Ac-1183.

References

Tsukamura et al. 1986.  Mycobacterium moriokaense sp. nov., a rapidly growing, nonphotochromogenic Mycobacterium. Int. J. Syst. Bacteriol., 36, 333–338.

External links
Type strain of Mycobacterium moriokaense at BacDive -  the Bacterial Diversity Metadatabase

Acid-fast bacilli
moriokaense
Bacteria described in 1986